Focus 11 is the fourteenth studio album by Dutch progressive rock band Focus, released in November 2018 on in and Out of Focus Records. It is their first album to feature bassist Udo Pannekeet, who replaced Bobby Jacobs in 2016.

Track listing

 "Who's Calling?" (Thijs van Leer) – 5:27
 "Heaven" (van Leer) – 4:26
 "Theodora Na Na Na" (van Leer) – 4:27
 "How Many Miles?" (van Leer) – 4:48
 "Mazzel" (van Leer) – 4:23
 "Winnie" (van Leer) – 5:13
 "Palindrome" (van Leer) – 5:33
 "Clair-Obscur" (van Leer) – 3:14
 "Mare Nostrum" (Udo Pannekeet) – 5:08
 "Final Analysis" (van Leer) – 3:51
 "Focus 11" (van Leer) – 6:11

Personnel
 Thijs van Leer – organ, piano, synthesizers, flute, vocals
 Menno Gootjes – guitar
 Udo Pannekeet – bass, mixing
 Pierre van der Linden – drums
 Geert Scheijgrond – producing, mixing

References
 http://www.focustheband.co.uk
 https://progjazz.nl/releases/cd-focus-focus-11
 https://www.allmusic.com/album/focus-11-mw0003229202
 https://www.loudersound.com/news/focus-announce-a-new-studio-album-focus-11
 https://www.allaboutjazz.com/11-thijs-vanleer-cherry-red-records-review-by-glenn-astarita.php

2019 albums
Focus (band) albums